The Balearic Islands autonomous basketball team is the basketball team of Balearic Islands. The team is not affiliated to FIBA, so only plays friendly games.

History
Balearic Islands will play two games in June 2013 against Lithuania. The head coach of the team, Xavi Sastre, called up two ACB champions like Rudy Fernández and Sergio Llull and another eight players in the league.

Roster
This is the roster of the Balearic Islands team for the 2013 games against Lithuania.

|}
| valign="top" |
 Head coach

Legend
(C) Team captain
Club field describes pro clubduring the 2012–13 season
|}

Games played

References

External links
Balearic Islands Federation website

Sports teams in the Balearic Islands
Balearic Islands